Nejc Skubic (born 13 June 1989) is a retired Slovenian footballer who played as a right-back.

Club career
Skubic signed a six-month contract with Romanian side Oțelul Galați in July 2011 and made his debut during a Cupa României match on 20 September 2011. He returned to Domžale in January 2012, signing two-and-a-half year contract.

International career
Skubic received his first call-up to the senior Slovenia squad for the UEFA Euro 2016 qualifier against San Marino in October 2015.

International goals
Scores and results list Slovenia's goal tally first, score column indicates score after each Skubic goal.

Honours
Interblock
Slovenian Cup: 2007–08, 2008–09
Konyaspor
Turkish Cup: 2016–17
Turkish Super Cup: 2017

References

External links

Nejc Skubic profile at NZS 

1989 births
Living people
Sportspeople from Kranj
Slovenian footballers
Association football fullbacks
NK IB 1975 Ljubljana players
NK Ivančna Gorica players
NK Drava Ptuj players
ASC Oțelul Galați players
NK Domžale players
Konyaspor footballers
Slovenian PrvaLiga players
Slovenian Second League players
Liga I players
Süper Lig players
Slovenian expatriate footballers
Expatriate footballers in Romania
Slovenian expatriate sportspeople in Romania
Expatriate footballers in Turkey
Slovenian expatriate sportspeople in Turkey
Slovenia youth international footballers
Slovenia under-21 international footballers
Slovenia international footballers